The Gaucho Sheepdog is a dog breed that originated in the Pampas, Brazil. The breed is not recognized by the Fédération Cynologique Internationale (FCI), but it has been recognized by the CBKC, a Brazilian kennel club affiliated with FCI. Dogs of this breed are often characterized as sturdy and agile, which makes them suitable for herding activities. The Gaucho sheepdog is widely used for herding sheep and other livestock, especially in the southern region of Brazil.

History 
The Gaucho Sheepdog was discovered in Rio Grande do Sul, Brazil by shepherds in search of dogs with better herding abilities.

There are two theories for the origin of the breed. The older and more widespread theory argues that the Gaucho Sheepdog descends from herding dogs (unspecific breed) in Rio Grande do Sul. This theory is based on the physical and behavioral characteristics of the breed, as well as historical context. The breed bears similarities to the Border Collie and Rough Collie breeds that arrived with European settlers in the 19th and 20th century to herd farm animals such as cattle, horses, and sheep. The Border Collie likely arrived in  the municipality of Uruguaiana in Rio Grande do Sul in the 1950s, along with a herd of Australian Merino sheep. Subsequently, these dogs were introduced in Pelotas city. The Rough Collies first arrived at the end of the 19th century with European immigrants, then later in the early 20th century. In addition to arriving with their European owners, this breed was also imported by farmers who wanted to modernize herd management techniques on their ranches.

As a result of a recent historical, morphological, and behavioral study of the breed, a second origin theory developed. This hypothesis posits that the Gaucho Sheepdog descended from the herding dogs (unspecific breed) in the region, as well as the Rough Collie, Estrela Mountain Dog, and German Shepherd.

Both theories conclude that the herding breeds, upon arriving in this region, underwent genetic selection. Dogs with sheep herding aptitude were bred selectively to meet demand from gaucho cowboys seeking herding dogs. A new breed emerged in a short time: the Gaucho Sheepdog, with a phenotype more adapted to the climate and geography of the region and a temperament more adapted to the needs of the local cowboys, maintaining an excellent aptitude for sheep herding.

Appearance 
Morphologically, Gaucho Sheepdogs are similar to Border Collies, but they move differently when they are shepherding. Their size and height are medium, larger than Border Collies and a little bit smaller than Collies. Their coats are of moderate length, with or without an undercoat, in various colors.

Temperament
This breed is not known to be aggressive. Gaucho Sheepdogs are seen as good watchdog candidates since they are alert to strange noises, although they seldom attack intruders. They are smart dogs and learn commands quickly, and they are not aggressive with their herds. These dogs are known to co-exist happily with humans, as they are docile and friendly.

Bibliography 
  Marcos Pennacchi, Revista Cães & Cia nº 293, Editora Forix, 2003.
  Andrea Calmon, Almanaque Cães & Raças 2009, Editora On Line, 2009.

See also
 Dogs portal
 List of dog breeds
 Dogue Brasileiro
 Fila Brasileiro
 Terrier Brasileiro
 Campeiro Bulldog

References

External links 
 Gaucho Sheepdog breed standard - CBKC 
 Reluta Kennel

Dog breeds originating in Brazil
Herding dogs
Rare dog breeds